Simplicimonas similis is a species of parabasalid.

References

Further reading

External links

Metamonads